Ali Nabizadeh (born March 5, 1996) is an Iranian footballer who plays as a midfielder for Zob Ahan F.C. in the Persian Gulf Pro League.

References

Iranian footballers
1996 births
Living people
Association football midfielders
Shahr Khodro F.C. players